Saurodactylus is genus of geckos endemic to Northern Africa, better known as lizard-fingered geckos.

Species
The genus is listed as containing 7 species:
Saurodactylus brosseti  - Morocco lizard-fingered gecko
Saurodactylus elmoudenii 
Saurodactylus fasciatus  -  banded-toed gecko or banded lizard-fingered gecko
Saurodactylus harrisii 
Saurodactylus mauritanicus  - Morocco lizard-fingered gecko
Saurodactylus slimanii 
Saurodactylus splendidus

References

 
Lizard genera
Taxa named by Leopold Fitzinger